Ideologia may refer to:

 Ideologia (Cazuza album), 1988
 Ideología, a 1995 album by Nepal band